Natalia is a 1988 French drama film directed by Bernard Cohn. It was screened in the Un Certain Regard section at the 1988 Cannes Film Festival.

Cast
 Pierre Arditi – Paul Langlade
 Philippine Leroy-Beaulieu – Natalia Gronska
 Gérard Blain – Claude Roitman
 Michel Voïta – Tomasz
 Dominique Blanc – Jacqueline Leroux
 Vernon Dobtcheff – Alfred Grabner
 Wladimir Yordanoff – Verdier
 Jacques Boudet – André Brachaire
 Gérard Boucaron – Jamain
 Elisabeth Kaza – La mère de Natalia (as Elizabeth Caza)
 Maria Machado – Inge Schwarzwald
 Fred Personne – André Valois
 Lionel Rocheman – Le père de Natalia
 Ludmila Mikaël – Catherine Valence

References

External links

1988 films
1988 drama films
French drama films
1980s French-language films
1980s French films